60 Aurigae is a binary star system in the northern constellation of Auriga. The pair have a combined apparent visual magnitude of 6.319 and, based upon parallax measurements, they are approximately  distant from the Earth.

The combined spectrum of the pair match a stellar classification of F5 V. The primary component may be an A-type star with an apparent magnitude of 
6.47, while the fainter, 8.96 magnitude secondary is possibly a G-type star. The pair orbit each other with a period of 271.1 years at an angular separation of 0.793 arcseconds.

Nomenclature
60 Aurigae is the Flamsteed designation of this star, also catalogued as HR 2541 and HD 50037.  The designation 60 Aurigae has sometimes been identified with Psi8 Aurigae however Simbad lists Psi8 Aurigae as 61 Aurigae.

References

External links
 HR 2541

Auriga (constellation)
F-type main-sequence stars
050037
033064
2541
Aurigae, 60
Binary stars